Jasionowo may refer to the following places:
Jasionowo, Augustów County in Podlaskie Voivodeship (north-east Poland)
Jasionowo, Gmina Rutka-Tartak in Podlaskie Voivodeship (north-east Poland)
Jasionowo, Gmina Szypliszki in Podlaskie Voivodeship (north-east Poland)